The following is a list of county-maintained roads in Winona County, Minnesota, United States. Some of the routes included in this list are also county-state-aid-highways (CSAH.)

Route list

References

 

Winona
Transportation in Winona County, Minnesota
Winona